Mary of Scotland may refer to:

People 
 Mary, Queen of Scots (1542–1587), Queen regnant of Scotland from 1542 to 1567
 Mary II of England (1662–1694), Queen regnant of Scotland, England and Ireland from 1689 until her death
 Mary of Scotland, Countess of Boulogne (1082–1116), daughter of Malcolm III of Scotland (Máel Coluim III) and Saint Margaret of Scotland; wife of Eustace III of Boulogne
 Mary of Scotland (–), daughter of Robert III of Scotland and Annabella Drummond
 Mary Stewart, Countess of Buchan (?–1465), daughter of James I of Scotland and Joan Beaufort; wife of Jan van Borselen, Lord of Campvere
 Mary of Guelders (1434–1463), Queen consort to James II of Scotland, and the regent of Scotland 1460–1463
 Mary Stewart, Countess of Arran (1453–1488), daughter of James II of Scotland and Mary of Guelders; married Thomas Boyd, 1st Earl of Arran and James Hamilton
 Mary of Guise (1515–1560), Queen consort to James V of Scotland and mother of Mary, Queen of Scots; regent of Scotland 1544–1560
 Henrietta Maria of France (1609–1669), Queen consort of Scotland, England and Ireland, also known as Queen Mary
 Mary of Modena (1658–1718), Queen consort of Scotland, England and Ireland

Other uses 
 Mary of Scotland (play), 1933 Broadway play by Maxwell Anderson
 Mary of Scotland (film), a 1936 film about Mary, Queen of Scots, based on the Maxwell Anderson stage play of the same name

See also
 Mary Tudor (disambiguation)
 Mary of England (disambiguation)